Selina Unamba (born 24 November 1999) is a Papua New Guinean footballer who plays as a forward for Lae FC and the Papua New Guinea women's national team.

Unamba is from Huon Gulf in Morobe Province and was educated at Goroka Grammar School. She started playing football in 2010. She was selected for the Papua New Guinea women's national under-20 football team for the 2016 Olympic qualifiers. She was part of the national team which won gold at the 2019 Pacific Games in Apia.

Notes

References

1999 births
Living people
Women's association football forwards
Papua New Guinean women's footballers
Papua New Guinea women's international footballers
Footballers at the 2014 Summer Youth Olympics